The Official Opposition Shadow Cabinet are leaders of the largest political party in the Legislative Assembly of British Columbia who are appointed by the Leader of the Opposition.

List
 Official Opposition Shadow Cabinet of the 38th Legislative Assembly of British Columbia
 Official Opposition Shadow Cabinet of the 40th Legislative Assembly of British Columbia
 Official Opposition Shadow Cabinet of the 42nd Legislative Assembly of British Columbia

See also
Cabinet of Canada
Official Opposition (Canada)
Shadow Cabinet

Politics of British Columbia